Zengcheng Stadium, or Zengcheng Kangwei Stadium is a multi-purpose stadium in Zengcheng District, Guangzhou, Guangdong, China. It was invested by Guangzhou Kangwei Sporting Goods Co. Ltd. and named after them. 

On 22 September 2002, the Hong Kong First Division League was hold in mainland China for the first time at Zengcheng Stadium, contested by Xiangxue Pharmaceutical and Double Flower. It served as the home stadium for Guangzhou Evergrande of the China League One in the 2010 league season.

References

Football venues in Guangzhou
Athletics (track and field) venues in China
Sports venues in Guangzhou
Multi-purpose stadiums in China